Leopold Ertl is an Austrian para-alpine skier. He represented Austria at the 1992 Winter Paralympics, at the 1994 Winter Paralympics and at the 1998 Winter Paralympics. He won the bronze medal in the Men's Giant Slalom B1 event at the 1994 Winter Paralympics.

See also 
 List of Paralympic medalists in alpine skiing

References 

Living people
Year of birth missing (living people)
Place of birth missing (living people)
Paralympic alpine skiers of Austria
Alpine skiers at the 1992 Winter Paralympics
Alpine skiers at the 1994 Winter Paralympics
Alpine skiers at the 1998 Winter Paralympics
Medalists at the 1994 Winter Paralympics
Paralympic bronze medalists for Austria
Paralympic medalists in alpine skiing
20th-century Austrian people